Edward R. Roybal Learning Center (formerly known as Belmont Learning Center, Vista Hermosa Learning Center, and Central Los Angeles High School 11), is a secondary school located in the Westlake area of Los Angeles, California. Built to alleviate overcrowding at the nearby Belmont High School, the school's construction has been with controversy surrounding its cost and discoveries of harmful gasses and an earthquake fault, leading to a temporary suspension in 1999 that wasn't lifted until 2003. After its start in 1988, the school opened on September 3, 2008, after 20 years.

History 

Early planning and construction of a new school called the Belmont Learning began in 1988 as an effort to reduce overcrowding at the near Belmont High School, with some of the land previously used for the Los Angeles City Oil Field. The school received some pushback due to the cost and how it would be financed. The school was designed by McLarand Vasquez & Partners, with the construction beginning in 1997. Construction was halted in 1999 after tests revealed that methane and hydrogen sulfide gases in the land, stemming from the oil field. Two years later, it was revealed that the land was situated on a major earthquake fault, with the construction stalled.

After the project was temporarily suspended in 2002, With the backing of new Superintendent Roy Romer and the LAUSD Board of Education, WWCOT took over from McLarand Vasquez & Partners and restarted construction in 2006, requiring the demolishing of some of the already completed classroom buildings and the administration building. In December 2004, approximately one-third of the buildings were demolished because of the earthquake fault, and then construction continued. The total cost for the school was estimated to be around $300 million.

On March 25, 2008, the LAUSD Board of Education voted to rename the Vista Hermosa Learning Center to the Edward R. Roybal Learning Center, honoring former city councilman and Congressman Edward R. Roybal who represented the area where the school is situated. On July 19, 2008, Vista Hermosa Park opened its doors before the fall opening of Roybal Learning Center, with the opening-day celebration that featured Mayor Antonio Villaraigosa and Supervisor Gloria Molina. On September 3, 2008, Roybal Learning Center opened for 2,400 students, with a ribbon-cutting ceremony held the day before.

Academics and programs 
The Roybal Learning Center opened with four small learning communities, the International School of Languages (ISL), the Activists for Educational Empowerment (AEE), the Business and Finance Academy (BFA), and the Computer Science Academy (CSA), as well as two independent pilot schools, Civitas School of Leadership and the School for Visual Arts and Humanities. The school later replaced ISL with the Academy for Social Work and Child Development (SWCD) and renamed the Activists for Educational Empowerment to Academy of Educational Empowerment. Each Academy has its own purpose and different techniques of teaching. BFA is more about involving students with the business atmosphere, SWCD trains students for jobs in the fields of social work and child development, CSA is about involving students with the computer atmosphere, and lastly, AEE provides their students with a sense of empowerment and helps them get involved.

In 2021, a new magnet school called the Roybal School of Film and Television Production opened on the campus with the support of high-profile celebrities such as George Clooney, Mindy Kaling, Kerry Washington, Eva Longoria and Don Cheadle.

Schools housed alongside Roybal

Current schools 
Downtown Magnets High School (2022–present)
Roybal School of Film and Television Production Magnet (2022–present)

Former schools 
Civitas School of Leadership (2008–2014)
 School for the Visual Arts and Humanities (2008–2015)
Los Angeles Academy of Art and Enterprise (2016–2021)

References

External links
 LAUSD Profile

Bibliography 
 Endres B (1999) An evaluation of the oil and gas migration hazards existing at the Belmont Learning Center Complex, Belmont Blue Ribbon Commission Hearings, October 1999

High schools in Los Angeles
Los Angeles Unified School District schools
Public high schools in California
Westlake, Los Angeles
History of Los Angeles
2008 establishments in California
Educational institutions established in 2008